Charles Frederick Gregory (24 October 1911–1985) was an English footballer who played in the Football League for Crystal Palace, Doncaster Rovers, Hartlepools United, Manchester City, Reading and Rotherham United.

References

1911 births
1985 deaths
English footballers
Association football defenders
English Football League players
Brodsworth Main Colliery F.C. players
Doncaster Rovers F.C. players
Manchester City F.C. players
Reading F.C. players
Crystal Palace F.C. players
Hartlepool United F.C. players
Rotherham United F.C. players